Eskdale Moor may refer to:
Boat How, a hill in the English Lake District
An area in Eskdale (Scotland)